Sarbanes Cottage is a historic cure cottage located at Saranac Lake in the town of Harrietstown, Franklin County, New York.  It was built in about 1930 and is a two-story, wood-frame duplex dwelling with stucco siding and a hipped roof, 40 feet square on a fieldstone foundation.  The basement once held the Sarbanes family's candy factory.

It was listed on the National Register of Historic Places in 1992.

References

Houses on the National Register of Historic Places in New York (state)
Houses completed in 1930
Houses in Franklin County, New York
National Register of Historic Places in Franklin County, New York